Kermes may refer to :

 Kermes (genus), a genus of insects
 Kermes (dye), a red dye made from the bodies of Kermes insects 
 Kermes oak also called Quercus coccifera, the tree on which the Kermes insects traditionally fed
 Alchermes, a confectionery remedy coloured red
 Kermesite, the mineral antimony oxysulfide (Sb2S2O), also known as red antimony  
 Kermes mineral, an older term for an imprecise compound of antimony oxides and sulfides
 Simone Kermes, a German soprano best known for her work in the virtuoso Baroque and Classical repertoire
 Kermesse (festival)

See also
 Alkermes (disambiguation)
 Kermesse (disambiguation)